Nartiang is one of the 60 Legislative Assembly constituencies of Meghalaya state in India. It is part of West Jaintia Hills district and is reserved for candidates belonging to the Scheduled Tribes. It falls under Shillong Lok Sabha constituency and its current MLA is Sniawbhalang Dhar of National People's Party.

Members of Legislative Assembly
The list of MLAs are given below

|-style="background:#E9E9E9;"
!Year
!colspan="2" align="center"|Party
!align="center" |MLA
!Votes
|-
|1972
|bgcolor="#CEF2E0"|
|align="left"| All Party Hill Leaders Conference
|align="left"| Edwingson Bareh
|3890 
|-
|1978
|bgcolor="#DDDDDD"|
|align="left"| Independent
|align="left"| H. Britainwar Dan 
|4112 
|-
|1983
|bgcolor="#DDDDDD"|
|align="left"| Independent
|align="left"| Edwingson Bareh
|3244
|-
|1988
|bgcolor="#00FFFF"|
|align="left"| Indian National Congress
|align="left"| H. Britainwar Dan 
|3383
|-
|1993
|bgcolor="#CEF2E0"|
|align="left"| All Party Hill Leaders Conference (Armison Marak faction)
|align="left"| Henry Lamin
|6037
|-
|1998 
|bgcolor="#CEF2E0"|
|align="left"| United Democratic Party
|align="left"| H. Britainwar Dan
|7735
|-
|2003
|bgcolor="#2E8B57"|
|align="left"| Meghalaya Democratic Party
|align="left"| Draison Kharshiing 
|4975 
|-
|2008
|bgcolor="#00B2B2"|
|align="left"| Nationalist Congress Party
|align="left"| E. C. Boniface Bamon
|7120
|-
|2013
|bgcolor="#00FFFF"|
|align="left"| Indian National Congress
|align="left"| Sniawbhalang Dhar
|18392
|-
|2018
|bgcolor="#DB7093"|
|align="left"| National People's Party
|align="left"| Sniawbhalang Dhar
|16604 
|}

Election results

2018

See also
List of constituencies of the Meghalaya Legislative Assembly
Shillong (Lok Sabha constituency)
West Jaintia Hills district

References

Assembly constituencies of Meghalaya
West Jaintia Hills district